Lisa Oz ( Lemole, born July 20, 1963) is an American author and radio and television personality who has been an occasional co-host of The Dr. Oz Show. She has appeared on the Oprah and Friends XM radio telecasts. Oz has authored or co-authored several books, including the You: The Owner's Manual series, and is host of The Lisa Oz Show.

Early life and education 
Lemole was born in Philadelphia in 1963 to Gerald and Emily Jane (Asplundh) Lemole. She is of part Italian descent. Her father was a surgeon who was on the team that performed one of the early heart transplants in the US in 1968 with doctors Michael E. DeBakey and Denton Cooley at the Texas Heart Institute. Her maternal grandfather was one of the co-founders of tree pruning service Asplundh.

She received her undergraduate degree from Bryn Mawr College in 1985, where she was captain of her college tennis team. She attended Union Theological Seminary and has written on spiritual studies. She is a Reiki master and has spoken widely of her insights into energy and health.

Career 
She is also an occasional contributor to Good Day New York, WNYW. She has been on The New York Times Best Seller list six times for her best selling books, including the US: Transforming Ourselves and the Relationships that Matter Most and the You: The Owner's Manual series.

She suggested the idea that her husband do his own show based on "practicing preventive medicine on a grand scale". She spoke to her husband's friend Campbell who was the then president of Discovery Health Channel.

Oz takes part in speaking engagements across the United States and the world on the subject of well-being and relationships. In 2011–2012, she collaborated with former Natural Law Party candidate Jeffrey M. Smith in narrating the documentary film Genetic Roulette—The Gamble of Our Lives asserting health risks from GMO foods used in support of a California ballot initiative in favor of GMO labeling.

Personal life 
She married Mehmet Oz on June 29, 1985, in Bryn Athyn, Pennsylvania. According to the New York Times, Lisa Oz's mother "believed fervently in New Age approaches like homeopathic remedies and meditation" and also introduced her husband to "alternative medicine and Eastern mysticism" which he now integrates into his advice programs. They have four children, including television host Daphne Oz.

See also 
 New Yorkers in journalism

References 

1963 births
Living people
American radio personalities
American people of Italian descent
American people of Swedish descent
Bryn Mawr College alumni
Union Theological Seminary (New York City) alumni
American Protestants